Witherbee is a hamlet and census-designated place (CDP) in the town of Moriah in Essex County, New York, United States. The population of the CDP was 347 at the 2010 census. Prior to 2010 the hamlet was part of the Mineville-Witherbee CDP.

Geography
Witherbee is located in the northern part of the town of Moriah and is bordered to the north by the hamlet of Mineville.

Demographics

History
Newport Pond, a 25 acre pond beside County Road 6 (Tracy Road) west of Witherbee, is namesake of a former royal fish pond in Newport, Essex, England, original manor of the Howland family ancestor John Howland, 1st Lord Newport Pond of Essex, England (1500-1546).
The Witherbee Memorial Hall was listed on the National Register of Historic Places in 1991.

Notable person
Former Major League Baseball pitcher Johnny Podres was born in Witherbee.

References

Census-designated places in New York (state)
Census-designated places in Essex County, New York